Joseph Pitty Couthouy (6 January 1808 – 4 April 1864) was an American naval officer, conchologist, and invertebrate palaeontologist. Born in Boston, Massachusetts, he entered the Boston Latin School in 1820.  He married Mary Greenwood Wild on 9 March 1832.

Couthouy applied to President Andrew Jackson for a position on the Scientific Corps of the U.S. Navy's Exploring Expedition of 1838.

He sailed with the expedition on 18 August 1838, but was sent to the Sandwich Islands for sick leave.  Eventually, he dismissed according to Charles Wilkes for attempting to "promote dissension, bring me into disrepute, and destroy the harmony and efficiency of the Squadron."

Although he meticulously labeled all of his specimens from the expedition, Dall recounts how "The authorities in Washington had appointed a reverened gentleman who knew nothing of science, with a fat salary, to unpack and take care of the specimens sent home by the expedition."  This gentleman then separated the specimens from the tags thus rendering many of them useless. Couthouy returned to Washington and tried to work up what he could of the collection and was then informed, "to crown all of his misfortunes", that his pay was to be reduced by forty-four percent.  He then returned to his profession as a master in the merchant marine, visiting South America and the Pacific.

In 1854, he took command of an expedition to the Bay of Cumaná, where he spent three unsuccessful years in search of the wreck of the Spanish treasure ship San Pedro, lost there in the early part of the century.

A good linguist, he spoke fluent Spanish, French, Italian, and Portuguese, and had mastered several dialects used in the Pacific Islands.

In the American Civil War, Couthouy was ordered to command  on 31 December 1862, which was wrecked, and Couthouy made prisoner.  He later commanded .

Finally, he commanded  during the Red River Campaign. On 2 April 1864, he was shot by a sniper and died the following day.

See also

References

 Abbott, R.T., and M.E. Young (eds.). 1973. American Malacologists: A national register of professional and amateur malacologists and private shell collectors and biographies of early American mollusk workers born between 1618 and 1900. American Malacologists, Falls Church, Virginia. Consolidated/Drake Press, Philadelphia.
 Dall, W.H. 1888. Some American conchologists. Proceedings of the Biological Society of Washington 4:95-134.
 Johnson, R.I. 1946. Occasional Papers on Mollusks, Museum of Comparative Zoology, Harvard University 1(5):33-40.

Further reading
Joseph Pitty Couthouy: The Death of a Sailor-Scientist; edited by Gary D. Joiner and Jimmy H. Sandefur. In 

1808 births
1864 deaths
People from Boston
United States Navy officers
American paleontologists
Conchologists
People of the United States Exploring Expedition
Military personnel from Massachusetts
Union Navy officers
Union military personnel killed in the American Civil War